Uncut may refer to:

 Uncut (film), a 1997 Canadian docudrama film by John Greyson about censorship
 Uncut (magazine), a monthly British magazine with a focus on music, which began publishing in May 1997
 BET: Uncut, a Black Entertainment Television show that ended in 2006
 Kinski Uncut, the 1996 re-published title of Klaus Kinski's autobiography
 UK Uncut, United Kingdom-based tax avoidance protest groups established in October 2010
 US Uncut, United States-based tax avoidance protest groups established in February 2011
 Without circumcision
 Uncut (band), a Canadian rock band formed in 2001
 Uncut (album), an album by The Powder Blues